The Palais des Beaux Arts is a residential and office building at Löwengasse 47-47A in Vienna's third district, Landstraße. The building has housed the embassies of the Republic of Lithuania and the Republic of Moldova since 1994. The building was erected between 1908 and 1909 by Anton and Josef Drexler, who also designed several houses on Rudolf-von-Alt-Platz and contributed other designs to the surrounding Weißgerberviertel quarter of the district. The building was originally built as home to Chic Parisien, a center for fashion.

Design 
Its architecture features an original combination of elements of late Historicism and decorative motifs of West European Art Nouveau.

Austrian architecture critic Friedrich Achleitner lauded the structure for its rational ground plan and its contrasting, almost Baroque, abundance of decoration. He considered this layout noteworthy because it made the building easily adjustable.

The structure is dominated by a corner tower that resembles an inserted hinge, flanked by female figures holding globes. The interior features a vestibule decorated with floral stucco and reliefs of female figures in the staircase.

History 
The building has been home to a varied exhibition program since 2014, where alternating arts projects are displayed via Wi-Fi in and around the Palais des Beaux Arts, for visitors using smartphones and tablets.

Images

References

External links 
 Palais des Beaux Arts website (English)
 Anton Drexler - Architektenlexikon Architekturzentrum Wien 
 Josef Drexler - Architektenlexikon Architekturzentrum Wien

Buildings and structures in Landstraße
Residential buildings in Vienna
Tourist attractions in Vienna